Fuente Dé cable car (in Spanish teleférico de Fuente Dé) is an aerial lift line of Cantabria (Spain).

History
The idea of connecting a high-mountain area in the heart of Picos de Europa with Fuente Dé was firstly developed by José Antonio Odriozola, former president of the ''Federación Española de Montañismo (Spanish Mountaineering Federation), whose family was from comarca of Liébana. The line was designed by engineer José Calavera Ruiz and architect Ángel Hernández Morales. Its construction started in November 1962 and the opening ceremony was held on August 21, 1966.

Features
The line covers a  vertical drop. Cabins transport capacity is of 20 people and the trip, which does not have intermediate stops, lasts 3'40". The line has a single span and two independent sections with one cabin each, that can be operated separately.

Image gallery

References

External links 
 Cableway officiale site: Teleférico de Fuente Dé

Aerial tramways in Spain
Transport in Cantabria
Picos de Europa
1966 establishments in Spain